Enrico Carattoni (born 18 May 1985) is a Sammarinese politician and one of the Captains Regent, served with Matteo Fiorini.  He took office on 1 October 2017.

References

1985 births
People from Borgo Maggiore
Captains Regent of San Marino
Members of the Grand and General Council
Living people